Nasser Ebrahimi (born 15 May 1941 in Isfahan, Iran) is an Iranian retired football player and manager. Ebrahimi began playing football with the Shahin in the age of 22. He was joined to the Taj in 1968. He also played for Bargh from 1970 to 1979. He was retired in 1979.

He was assistant head coach of Iran for three times. He was head coach of national team from 1984 to 1985. He was also assistant head coach of Persepolis.

References 

1940 births
Iran national football team managers
Iranian football managers
Iranian footballers
Sportspeople from Isfahan
Esteghlal F.C. players
Persepolis F.C. non-playing staff
Living people
Association footballers not categorized by position